Gopinath Gajapati (6 March 1943 – 10 January 2020) was a member of the 9th and 10th Lok Sabha of India. He represented the Berhampur constituency of Odisha and was a member of the Indian National Congress political party. He later joined BJP, and moved to Biju Janata Dal in 2009.

On 10 January 2020, Gajapati died in a private hospital in Bhubaneswar at age 76.

References

1943 births
2020 deaths
Lok Sabha members from Odisha
India MPs 1989–1991
India MPs 1991–1996
Bharatiya Janata Party politicians from Odisha
Indian National Congress politicians from Odisha
Biju Janata Dal politicians
People from Paralakhemundi
People from Ganjam district